Madison and Woodburn Historic District is a registered historic district in Cincinnati, Ohio, listed in the National Register of Historic Places on June 30, 1983.  It contains 19 contributing buildings.

Most of the historic architecture dates from the period 1880 to 1910, when the East Walnut Hills neighborhood was booming as a streetcar suburb.

The historic district is centered on the imposing neo-gothic Saint Francis De Sales Catholic Church at the intersection of Madison Road and Woodburn Avenue.  This intersection and the business district along Woodburn Avenue are known locally as DeSales Corner.

Notes 

Historic districts in Cincinnati
National Register of Historic Places in Hamilton County, Ohio
Historic districts on the National Register of Historic Places in Ohio
Walnut Hills, Cincinnati